Aluminium(II) oxide  or aluminium monoxide is a compound of aluminium and oxygen with the chemical formula AlO. It has been detected in the gas phase after explosion of aluminized grenades in the upper atmosphere and in stellar absorption spectra.

Aluminium(II) oxide is one of the aluminium oxides (the most common is Aluminium oxide Al2O3), as it was the rare example of aluminium(II) compound since aluminium usually exists in its +3 oxidation state.

See also
Aluminium oxide
Aluminium(I) oxide

References

Aluminium compounds
Oxides